Susuga Tuilaepa Lupesoliai Neioti Aiono Sailele Malielegaoi (born 14 February 1944) is a Samoan politician and economist who served as the sixth prime minister of Samoa from 1998 to 2021. Tuilaepa is Samoa's longest serving prime minister and was leader of the opposition from 2021–2022. Since 1998, he has led the Human Rights Protection Party (HRPP). Tuilaepa first entered parliament in 1981 when he won a by-election to represent the electorate of Lepā. He also served as Deputy Prime Minister and Minister of Finance in the government of Prime Minister Tofilau Eti Alesana, and also held the portfolios of Tourism and Trade, Commerce & Industry.

Tuilaepa lost his majority in the 2021 election but refused to leave office, leading to the 2021 Samoan constitutional crisis. The crisis was resolved by Samoa's Court of Appeal on 23 July 2021, which ruled that Fiamē Naomi Mataafa had been prime minister  since 24 May. On 26 July, Tuilaepa conceded defeat and assumed the role of opposition leader the following day. Tuilaepa was indefinitely suspended from the legislative assembly on 24 May for breach of parliamentary privileges and contempt of parliament. The indefinite suspension was recommended by the privileges and ethics committee. He later described his suspension as a "witch hunt". However, he was later reinstated on 13 September following a Supreme Court ruling that voided the suspension. The privileges and ethics committee then reconvened and suggested that Tuilaepa be suspended again for 24 months. Parliament approved the recommendation on 19 October. His tenure as the opposition leader effectively ended in November 2022 after the speaker of parliament announced the legislature’s recognition of Tuilaepa in the role had ceased due to his suspension. He was later succeeded by Fonotoe Pierre Lauofo.

Biography

Tuilaepa, born in the village of Lepā on the island of Upolu, attended high school at St Joseph's College in Lotopa and at St Paul's College, Auckland in New Zealand. He then obtained a master's from the University of Auckland, becoming the first Samoan to receive a master's degree in commerce.

He worked as a civil servant for the Samoan treasury, and then became director of the Economics Department, and then deputy financial secretary. He then moved to Brussels, where he worked for the European Economic Community and for Coopers & Lybrand before winning election to the Samoan parliament in 1981.

Tuilaepa lost two relatives in the 2009 Samoa earthquake and tsunami, including the daughter of one of his nieces. The tsunami destroyed most of Malielegaoi's hometown of Lepā, leaving just the church and the village's welcome-sign standing.

Political career

Tuilaepa was appointed Minister of Economic Affairs in 1982 and Minister of Finance in 1984. He served as Deputy Prime Minister and Minister of Finance under Tofilau Eti Alesana following the Human Rights Protection Party's return to power after the coalition government of Vaai Kolone and Tupua. For a while he was both Prime Minister and Minister of Finance after Tofialu stepped down from the Premiership. However, following a Cabinet reshuffle after the following elections of 2001 in which he led the HRPP for an additional term, Tuilaepa relinquished the post of Minister of Finance to Misa Telefoni Retzlaff who also became the new Deputy Prime Minister.

The reason given for Tuilaepa's relinquishment of the Ministry of Finance was the amount of responsibility and work involved being both Prime Minister and Minister of Finance and to do the job properly required a full-time Minister.

Tuilaepa first won election to represent his Lepā district in 1980, after the death of the previous representative. He has been re-elected for Lepā since that time. He served as finance minister in the Tofilau government of 1991 and 1996. In 1991, he was appointed deputy prime minister. In 1998, Tofilau retired from parliament (and hence the prime ministership) due to ill-health. Tuilaepa then became the 6th Prime Minister of Samoa. He has successfully led his HRPP party to re-election in the 2001, 2006, 2011, and 2016 general elections. In 2012 Tuilaepa became Samoa's longest serving Prime Minister, surpassing the tenure of his predecessor, Tofilau Eti Alesana. At the time of his electoral defeat in 2021, Tuilaepa was also the second longest serving incumbent prime minister in the world, only behind Cambodia's Hun Sen.

Policies

Opposition to Fiji's Bainimarama 

Tuilaepa has emerged as one of Oceania's most vocal critics of Fijian interim leader Commodore Frank Bainimarama, who came to power in the 2006 Fijian coup d'état. Tuilaepa has stated that Bainimarama has shown little respect for the opinions of regional Pacific leaders. Tuilaepa has said that Bainimarama's actions since the 2006 coup have shown that Bainimarama has no intentions of returning Fiji to democratic rule or holding transparent, free elections. Tuilaepa cites numerous actions by Bainimarama to back up his criticisms, including rescinding assurances to leaders at a regional meeting in Tonga that elections would be held in May 2008. He has also criticised Bainimarama as a "no-show" at regional meetings of the Pacific Islands Forum in Niue and Papua New Guinea. Tuilaepa has said that Bainimarama's failure to compromise, hold democratic elections and meet with regional leaders is not the "Pacific way."

In a February 2009 continuation of the war of words between Bainimarama and Tuilaepa, Bainimarama accused Samoa's foreign policy of being dictated by New Zealand. He also accused Tuilaepa of being "un-Pacific". Tuilaepa fired back, questioning whether Bainimarama was sober when he made these claims and reiterating that Bainimarama shows little respect for Pacific leaders.

Regional Polynesian integration 

In late 2011, Tuilaepa initiated a meeting of Polynesian leaders which led, in November, to the formal launching of the Polynesian Leaders Group, a regional grouping intended to co-operate on a variety of issues including culture and language, education, responses to climate change, and trade and investment in Polynesian countries. The Group was in part a response to the Melanesian Spearhead Group.

Christianity

In June 2017, the Samoan Parliament passed a bill to increase support for Christianity in the country's constitution, including a reference to the Trinity. Article 1 of the Samoan Constitution states that “Samoa is a Christian nation founded of God the Father, the Son and the Holy Spirit”. According to The Diplomat, "What Samoa has done is shift references to Christianity into the body of the constitution, giving the text far more potential to be used in legal processes." The preamble to the constitution already described the country as "an independent State based on Christian principles and Samoan custom and traditions."

Sporting aspirations

Tuilaepa was founder of Apia West Rugby, and is currently chairman of the Samoa Rugby Union.  Tuilaepa competed for his country at the 2007 South Pacific Games in the sport of target archery. In participating in the Games, Tuilaepa became the first elected leader to represent his country at a multi-sport event.  Having taken up the sport only five months prior to the Games, Tuilaepa was ranked second in Samoa in the combined bow discipline. Tuilaepa's son was also a reserve team member.  On day 10 of the Games, Tuilaepa won a silver medal in the mixed recurve team play event.

Matai titles 

Tuilaepa has the following Faamatai titles.
 Tuilaepa
 Lupesoliai
 Neioti 
 Aiono
 Fatialofa 
 Lolofie
 Galumalemana (Vaitele) 
 Aueluā

Criticism

Traffic lane switch

Tuilaepa's government passed highly controversial legislation in 2009 to switch Samoan road use from right to left-hand traffic. The controversy resulted in a peaceful demonstration which drew more than 15,000 people the largest protest demonstration in Samoan history, and to the founding of the People's Party, a political party established to protest against changing sides.

International Date Line shift

In 2011, Tuilaepa's government introduced a bill to shift Samoa west of the International Date Line, to facilitate economic relations with Australia, New Zealand and Asia (by ensuring that Samoa would no longer be one calendar day away from them). According to Samoa Observer editor Keni Lesa, many Samoans viewed the bill as "another crazy idea from our crazy prime minister". Opposition politicians also criticised it, arguing that it would not increase exports, and that it would in fact deprive Samoa of "its unique tourism selling point as the last place on earth to see the sun", just east of the Date Line. Tuilaepa responded by calling opposition MP Lealailepule Rimoni Aiafi (of the Tautua Samoa Party) "very stupid", adding that "only an idiot" would fail to see the merits of the bill. However, the bill had the support of the Samoa Chamber of Commerce and the vast majority of the private and finance sector. The major benefit being that, given that most trade was conducted with New Zealand and Australia, and a growing trade sector with South East and East Asia, that being on the same day as these major trading partners would lead to improvements in productivity, as more trade could be facilitated during a shared five-day week, as opposed to the previous situation of only sharing four week days to conduct business.

Measles outbreak

A measles outbreak began in September 2019.  As of 26 December, there were 5,612 confirmed cases of measles and 81 deaths, out of a Samoan population of 200,874. Over two percent of the population has been infected.

The outbreak has been attributed to a sharp drop in measles vaccination from the previous year. In 2013, 90% of babies in Samoa received the measles-mumps-rubella vaccination at one year of age. On 6 July 2018 on the east coast of Savaii, two 12-month-old children died after receiving MMR vaccinations. The cause of death was incorrect preparation of the vaccine by two nurses who mixed vaccine powder with expired anaesthetic instead of the appropriate diluent. These two deaths were picked up by anti-vaccine groups and used to incite fear towards vaccination on social media. The government stopped its vaccination programme for 10 months, despite advice from the WHO. The incident caused many Samoan residents to lose trust in the healthcare system.

Nevertheless, as of 29 December a public inquiry into the government's role in suspending vaccinations had not been announced. Deputy director of health Gaualofa Matalavea Saaga stated, "Having our case blasted out to the world is the last thing we want." Samoa's political opposition called for the health minister to be removed from his position.

2021 Samoan general election

During the 2021 general election held on 9 April 2021, Tuilaepa was re-elected to his parliamentary constituency of Lepā unopposed.
Preliminary results from the general election indicated that the HRPP had secured 24 seats, FAST 23 and Tautua Samoa and an Independent both winning one seat. An accounting error was detected in the Vaimauga No. 2 constituency, which had incorrectly displayed the Tautua Samoa candidate leading ahead of the HRPP candidate. This subsequently showed the results for the HRPP and FAST tied with 25 seats each, and first term Independent MP Tuala Iosefo Ponifasio holding the balance of power.

After the election, the HRPP and FAST entered into talks with Tuala in an attempt to win him over in order to form a new government. Before Tuala had made a decision, the Samoan Electoral Commission announced that the 10% female quota in parliament had not been fulfilled. An extra seat was added in parliament going to the HRPP. Tuala agreed to enter into a coalition with FAST, resulting in a hung parliament in which both parties had 26 seats each.

On the evening of 4 May 2021, O le Ao o le Malo (Head of State) Tuimalealiifano Vaaletoa Sualauvi II announced that a second election would be held in order to resolve the deadlock. This occurred before any of the electoral petitions were resolved. The HRPP endorsed the decision, whilst it was opposed by FAST. Tuilaepa reportedly advised Sualauvi II to issue the proclamation. The HRPP then began to campaign for the second election, despite the legality of it being in question.

On 17 May, the Supreme Court of Samoa ruled that the addition of the new seat was unconstitutional, giving FAST a parliamentary majority. They subsequently overturned the voiding of the 9 April election results and declared that the call for a new election had no legal authority, and ordered parliament to convene within 45 days of the original polling. Thus preventing Tuilaepa and the HRPP from being re-elected. The O le Ao o le Malo then issued a statement, proclaiming that parliament convene on 24 May. This was retracted shortly after, triggering a constitutional crisis. The O le Ao o le Malo did not elaborate on why the decision was made.

2021 Samoan constitutional crisis

Tuilaepa denounced the court decision to convene parliament as "illegal", and that the Supreme Court justices should be charged for breaching the state of emergency regulations. Tuilaepa also announced that he and the HRPP caucus would refuse to be sworn in when parliament convened. On the evening of 23 May, a day before the scheduled convention of parliament, Parliament speaker Leaupepe Toleafoa Faafisi purported to cancel the swearing-in ceremony in defiance of the Supreme Court's ruling. The following morning, the FAST caucus and supporters arrived at parliament only to find it locked and surrounded by police. When the O le Ao o le Malo did not show up, Fiamē Naomi Mataafa and the FAST caucus were sworn in outside parliament under a tent. Tuilaepa denounced the ceremony and accused Fiamē and the FAST party of treason.

On 29 May, Tuilaepa was cited for contempt of court for not obeying the court's orders and using offensive language towards the Supreme Court justices.

On 3 June, Tuilaepa entered into negotiations with Fiamē to discuss a political transition. After only two sessions the talks reached an impasse, with Tuilaepa refusing to either leave the prime ministership or convene parliament unless all petitions were resolved.

Due to various electoral court petitions, the HRPP's seat count in parliament fell from 25 to 17 whilst FAST maintained its 26-seat majority.

On 23 July 2021, the Court of Appeal ruled that the 24 May swearing in of the FAST party was legal and that they had been the government since then. The court also declared that Tuilaepa and the HRPP ministers had been illegally occupying the government offices since that date. Following the court decision, Tuilaepa accused the judiciary of "treason" and stated that the decision was "bizarre". He also claimed that "leaders are chosen by god". The following day he began to pack up his office. On 25 July, the head of state recognised the new FAST government. Tuilaepa conceded defeat on 26 July, nearly three months after the election.

On 23 March 2022 he was convicted alongside HRPP secretary Lealailepule Rimoni Aiafi of scandalising the court for his attacks on the judiciary during and following the constitutional crisis, but escaped penalty. On 24 May 2022 both were suspended indefinitely from the Legislative Assembly after the Privileges Committee found that they had brought parliament into disrepute.

Leader of the Opposition (2021–2022)

On 27 July 2021, Tuilaepa assumed the role of opposition leader. Shortly after, he began to call for the resignation of all the Supreme Court justices. Tuilaepa also continued to question the judgement of the court of appeals on their recognition of FAST as the new government.

In November 2022, speaker Papalii declared that parliament no longer recognised Tuilaepa as the official opposition leader due to his suspension, effectively ending his tenure. On 27 January 2023, parliament voted for HRPP deputy leader Fonotoe Pierre Lauofo to succeed Tuila‘epa as the opposition leader.

Convoy protest

On 30 July, Tuilaepa and supporters of the HRPP led a convoy protest against the judiciary. Once the convoy arrived in Savaii, the HRPP set out to lay wreaths at the graves of former HRPP prime ministers Tofilau Eti Alesana and Vaai Kolone. The convoy were able to lay wreaths at Tofilau's grave, but were refused to do so at Kolone's by his son Vaai Papu Vaai. The HRPP had used Vaai Kolone's image in an advertisement to promote the party's demonstration in Savaii, something that Vaai Papu expressed discontent about. Vaai Papu had been critical of the HRPP's actions during the 2021 constitutional crisis, and stated that the party should be "ashamed" and accused them of using his father's image "in vain". He also suggested that the party change its name from the ‘Human Rights Protection Party’ to the ‘Malielegaoi Human Rights Demolition Party’. 
The convoy was forced to turn around, when the villages of Salelologa and Sasina on Savaii established roadblocks and refused the HRPP passage. Tuilaepa deemed the roadblocks "unlawful", but agreed to turn back for ‘the sake of peace’. Despite the rally not folding out as he intended, Tuilaepa declared the convoy protest to be a ‘victory’. 
He then accused FAST Chairman and Minister of Agriculture, Fisheries and Scientific Research, Laauli Leuatea Polataivao, of being the ‘mastermind’ behind the road blocks. Laauli denied being involved. Tuilaepa issued an informal apology to the judiciary on 8 September after weeks of criticising and protesting against them. He also expressed that it is the ‘nature of the role of the opposition to question all three arms of government’. Tuilaepa later contradicted this, when he denied ever apologising to the judiciary.

Threat of lawsuit against the ministry of finance

On 21 August 2021, the Minister of Finance, Mulipola Anarosa Ale Molioo expressed that she ‘did not have the complete confidence’ in the chief executive officer of the Ministry of Finance, Oscar Malielegaoi son of Tuilaepa. In response, Tuilaepa stated that whilst they can sack the C.E.O for a lack of cooperation with the minister, he would file a lawsuit against the ministry should they not have ‘strong reasons’ for carrying out this decision. Ale Molioo later requested that Oscar Malielegaoi resign, which he then did on 28 August.

Claims of feminist plot
On 24 August 2021 Tuilaepa claimed that he had been unseated by a feminist plot led by New Zealand Prime Minister Jacinda Ardern, who allegedly "wanted Samoa to have a female Prime Minister". This was later rejected by prime minister Ardern.

Swearing in of the HRPP caucus
During the ad hoc ceremony outside parliament on 24 May 2021, FAST MPs were sworn in whilst the HRPP members were absent. Once the Supreme Court recognised the ceremony as legal, uncertainty arose about whether the HRPP caucus would be able to be sworn in at the convention of parliament. The Samoan constitution states that parliament must convene within 45 days of an election, 24 May was the last day for parliament to meet within the deadline. On 1 September 2021, prime minister Fiamē Naomi Mataafa announced that the 17th Samoan parliament would convene on 14 September. Shortly before the prime minister's announcement, Tuilaepa wrote to the speaker of the legislative assembly Papalii Lio Taeu Masipau, asserting that himself and the HRPP caucus intend to be sworn by the head of state once parliament convenes. Papalii then replied by saying that the HRPP caucus would be sworn in by himself in accordance with the constitution. Regardless of whether they would be sworn in or not, Tuilaepa announced that the HRPP caucus would attend the first convention of the 17th parliament. A day before the sitting of parliament, Papalii announced that the HRPP members would not be sworn and that they would not be permitted to attend. Thus making it likely that Tuilaepa and the HRPP caucus will have to contend by elections in order to return to parliament. On the morning of 14 September, Tuilaepa and the opposition HRPP MPs along with supporters of the party, attempted to enter parliament. They were stopped by the police who told them to turn back, the crowd returned to party headquarters two hours later. Tuilaepa described the event as being "a sad day for Samoa", he also accused the FAST party of being ‘dictatorial’. He then announced that the HRPP would be challenging the speaker's decision in court. The Supreme Court ruled in the HRPP's favour on 16 September, ordering the speaker to swear in all 18 elected members of the HRPP caucus. Papalii had them sworn in the following morning.

Opposition to abortion legalisation proposal

In November 2021, Tuilaepa rejected a United Nations recommendation for Samoa to legalise abortion. He described abortion as ‘murder’ and stated that it should not be legalised as it violates Samoa's ‘Christian beliefs’. Tuilaepa also commented that not all UN proposals are ‘good and suitable’ for all nation-states, adding that "this is because the world is made of different people with different beliefs and from different ethnic groups." He also said that some UN proposals, particularly abortion, were not "applicable" to Samoa.

Calls to step down

Following a poor showing at the November 2021 Samoan by-elections, HRPP MP and former Minister of Education, Sports and Culture Loau Keneti Sio called upon Tuilaepa to resign when he stated that HRPP senior members should "hang up their boxing gloves". Despite the HRPP having won all seven electorates up for by-elections in the April general election, the party only retained two seats. Tuilaepa responded to Loau's statement by denying "tension (was) brewing within the Human Rights Protection Party". Instead, he expressed that 'Samoa's oldest political party is still in unity' and that the HRPP fight is "far from over". Tuilaepa later said he was ready for party members to address a potential resignation.

Suspension from parliament

Following Tuilaepa's permanent suspension from the legislative assembly, after the privileges and ethics committee found him and the HRPP secretary Lealailepule Rimoni Aiafi in contempt of parliament, the HRPP filed a lawsuit against the decision. The order arose following a formal complaint by deputy prime minister Tuala Iosefo Ponifasio. Tuilaepa claimed that his permanent suspension violated the terms of the ‘Harmony Agreement’ signed by his party and FAST, which sought a resolution to the constitutional crisis of 2021. Tuilaepa, who was absent from parliament when the suspension came into effect as he was in isolation following a trip to Ireland to attend the World Rugby Council meeting, stated his absence meant he could not defend himself, implying unfairness. In response, the chair of the privileges and ethics committee, Valasi Toogamaga Tafito, dismissed Tuilaepa's claims and highlighted the three-hour zoom call that the committee had with him. Tuilaepa later accused prime minister Fiamē of being the "mastermind" behind his indefinite suspension and stated that "no secret can remain forever in a small society like Samoa, and eventually no leader can continue to hide forever whilst directing others to do her dirty bidding." Fiamē dismissed the claims as false. Tuilaepa also claimed that FAST was conducting a "witch hunt" and alleged that the governing party behaved as if they were in the opposition. He urged FAST to focus instead on "nation-building" and issues such as the COVID 19 pandemic, climate change and the effects of both on the Samoan economy. On 30 August, the supreme court ruled the suspension to be unconstitutional. He was reinstated on 13 September.

The privileges and ethics committee subsequently reviewed Tuilaepa's case and recommended that he and Lealailepule be re-suspended without pay for 24 months. The legislative assembly then approved the committee's motion on 19 October, with all present FAST members and one from the HRPP voting for it. Tuilaepa reacted by stating that he and Lealailepule would not resign from their seats, insisting, "if we resign, it will make it look like we did something wrong, and we are admitting it. But we know we did not do anything wrong..." The deputy prime minister demanded that Tuilaepa and the HRPP apologise for their actions in the constitutional crisis, but the opposition leader refused and said "why would we apologise when we did not do anything wrong? We only apologise to God which is what we had done, but never to them (FAST)". One high-ranking Matai in Lepā affirmed that support for Tuilaepa in the constituency was high.

Assassination attempts

Tuilaepa has been the target of three plots to kill him; one of those being almost successful when in 1999, Eletise Leafa Vitale, tried to kill him but instead one of Tuilaepa's Cabinet Ministers was murdered. In December 2010, another plot was uncovered by Samoan police and, in August 2019, authorities foiled a detailed plan to assassinate him.

Notes

References 

1944 births
Anti-abortion activists
Government ministers of Samoa
Human Rights Protection Party politicians
Living people
Members of the Legislative Assembly of Samoa
People from Atua (district)
Prime Ministers of Samoa
Deputy Prime Ministers of Samoa
Finance ministers of Samoa
Foreign ministers of Samoa
Samoan chiefs
Samoan economists
Samoan Roman Catholics
People educated at St Paul's College, Auckland
University of Auckland alumni
20th-century Samoan politicians
21st-century Samoan politicians